Forester Football Club (Thai ฟอเรสเตอร์ เอฟซี) is a Thai semi-professional Football Club of Faculty of Forestry, Kasetsart University based in Bang Khen District, Bangkok, Thailand. The club is currently playing in the Thai Football Division 3.

Record

References
 104 ทีมร่วมชิงชัย! แบโผผลจับสลาก ดิวิชั่น 3 ฤดูกาล 2016

External links
 Facebookpage

Association football clubs established in 2007
Football clubs in Bangkok
Sport in Bangkok
2007 establishments in Thailand